Elder God may refer to:

 Elder God (Cthulhu Mythos), a type of fictional deity added to H. P. Lovecraft's Cthulhu mythos.
 The Elder God, a video-game character in the Legacy of Kain series
 Elder Gods (Mortal Kombat), fictional entities in the Mortal Kombat mythos